This is a list of flag bearers who have represented Fiji at the Olympics.

Flag bearers carry the national flag of their country at the opening ceremony of the Olympic Games.

See also

Fiji at the Olympics

References

Fiji at the Olympics
Fiji
Olympic flagbearers